IBD may refer to:

In business:
 Investment Banking Division, a department of an investment bank
 Independent Bicycle Dealers, a small bicycle business
 Investor's Business Daily, a national newspaper in the United States

In science and medicine:
 Identity by descent, alleles that are identical because they descended directly from the same ancestral allele
 Inclusion body disease, a destructive virus occurring in boid snakes
 Infectious bursal disease, a poultry disease causing immunosuppression
 Inflammatory bowel disease, a group of inflammatory conditions of the large and small intestines
 Inverse beta decay, a nuclear reaction commonly used in neutrino detectors
 Iodobenzene dichloride, a reagent used in organic chemistry
 Ion beam deposition

Other uses:
 Institute of Brewing and Distilling, an international industry trade association
 International Beer Day, an August 5 celebration
 India's Best Dancer, a dance reality show